Robert Kyagulanyi Ssentamu, known by his stage name Bobi Wine, is a Ugandan politician, singer, and actor. He is a former Member of Parliament for Kyadondo County East constituency in Wakiso District, in Uganda's Central Region. He also leads the National Unity Platform political party. In June 2019, he announced his candidacy for the 2021 Ugandan presidential election. He participated in the 2021 election where he lost to the incumbent Yoweri Kaguta Museveni, a result which Kyagulanyi and a large section of the public strongly disputed.

On December 14, 2021, he was placed under house arrest by the Government of Uganda. He has continued to protest his arrest.

Early life and education

Kyagulanyi was born in Nkozi Hospital, where his mother worked as a midwife. He grew up in the Kamwokya slum in the northeastern part of Kampala, the capital city of Uganda.

Kyagulanyi attended Kitante Hill School, where he attained his Uganda Certificate of Education in 1996, as well as Kololo Senior Secondary School, where he attained his Uganda Advanced Certificate of Education in 1998. He then attended Makerere University in Kampala, where he studied music, dance, and drama, graduating with a diploma in 2003. In 2016, Kyagulanyi returned to university to study law at the International University of East Africa.

Entertainment career

Music career
Kyagulanyi began his music career in the early 2000s, and adapted the stage name BobiRob which he later changed to Bobi Wine. His first singles "Akagoma", "Funtula", and "Sunda" (featuring Ziggy D) brought him success in the Ugandan music scene. His music has been characterised as kidandali,reggae, dancehall, and afrobeat, often with a socially conscious message. He was the leader of the group Fire Base Crew until its disbandment, after which he started a new group known as Ghetto Republic of Uganja. He has released more than 70 songs over 15 years.

In 2016, his song "Kiwani" was featured on the soundtrack for the Disney movie Queen of Katwe.

Bobi Wine’s major music genre has always been Afrobeat music. Bobi Wine’s music was being sold and promoted by the late Kasiwukira. He acknowledged receiving receipts of 60M from his music sales in just one month from Kasiwukira. He has a fully Monetized YouTube channel with tens of millions of views. He has held various concerts and performances in addition to brand endorsements all that bring income to him. He owns a commercial production studio in Kamwokya known as FireBase records.

Film career
Kyagulanyi is also a film actor, mainly starring in local Ugandan movies. In 2010, he was cast in Cleopatra Kyoheirwe's drama film Yogera. In 2015, he was cast in a lead role in the Twaweza-supported film Situka with Hellen Lukoma. He has also worked on a number of other films, including Divizionz.

Bobi Wine had his own reality TV show named The Ghetto President

Political career
In April 2017, Kyagulanyi announced his candidacy for parliament in a by-election for Kyadondo County East constituency. His door-to-door walking campaign attracted attention both in Uganda and abroad. He won the contest by a wide margin, beating two seasoned candidates: Sitenda Sebalu of the ruling National Resistance Movement (NRM) party and Apollo Kantinti of the main opposition party Forum for Democratic Change (FDC).

In 2018, Kyagulanyi gained increasing fame, championing the victories in most of the by-elections by the candidates he campaigned for, thus beating out NRM and FDC candidates.

Arua by-election incident
On 14 August 2018, supporters of the independent candidate for parliament Kassiano Wadri allegedly obstructed and attacked President Museveni's convoy in the northern town of Arua, near Gulu. Museveni's motorcade was allegedly pelted with stones, leading to clashes between security forces and protesters. Later, Kyagulanyi, an outspoken critic of Museveni, revealed through a social media post that police had intentionally shot at his vehicle, killing his driver. Kyagulanyi had endorsed Wadri's candidacy against the official pro-Museveni candidate in Arua.

Kyagulanyi was arrested on 15 August 2018 for possible charges of unlawful possession of firearms and incitement to violence, after which he was brought in front of a military court and charged with the former the following day. The Times reported that Kyagulanyi appeared to have been beaten before appearing in court. Kampala Lord Mayor Erias Lukwago, a lawyer who has represented detained MPs, said that Kyagulanyi was in a worrying state of health and needed urgent medical attention. The government has repeatedly denied allegations of torture. Ugandan opposition leader Kizza Besigye called a press conference, where he demanded the MP's immediate release.

With popular protests growing in Uganda demanding Kyagulanyi's release, and heated discussions in the Ugandan Parliament, the Ugandan State prosecution withdrew the charges filed during Kyagulanyi's second appearance in front of the General Court Martial in Gulu on 23 August 2018. The prosecution indicated it would further pursue possible charges in a civilian court for a possible trial of the MP. Upon release, Kyagulanyi was rearrested and charged with treason in a civilian court. In September 2018, Kyagulanyi was released on bail and travelled to the United States for medical treatment for injuries he allegedly received in custody. The Ugandan government banned his supporters from gathering on the day of his release, and on the day of his return from the United States. He eventually addressed his supporters in a gathering outside his home upon his return to Uganda on 20 September 2018.

In August 2019, Kyagulanyi was charged with "intent to alarm, annoy or ridicule" President Museveni for his role in the Arua incident the previous year. The charges came a day after the death of Ziggy Wine, a fellow Ugandan musician and staunch critic of Museveni, who was kidnapped and tortured by unknown assailants.

Anti-social media tax protest
On 22 April 2019, Kyagulanyi was detained while attempting to make his way to a planned concert at his private club in southern Kampala, which was cancelled by police. He was accused of leading a protest in the city the previous year without prior police authorisation; the protest was held against the "social media tax" which took effect in July 2018. On 29 April 2019, on his way to the offices of the Criminal Investigations Directorate (CID) to honour a summons and provide a statement on the cancelled concert, Kyagulanyi was again arrested and taken to Buganda Road Court, where he was charged with disobedience of statutory duty and remanded to Luzira Maximum Security Prison until his bail hearing on 2 May. In a statement the following day, Amnesty International demanded his immediate release and urged the Ugandan government to "stop misusing the law in a shameless attempt to silence him for criticizing the government." On the day of the hearing, which was conducted via video conferencing (the first time in the history of Uganda's justice system), Kyagulanyi was granted bail and released from prison, with the court also barring him from holding unlawful demonstrations.

2021 presidential election

On 24 July 2019, Kyagulanyi formally announced his bid to run for president in the 2021 general election. On 22 July 2020, he announced that he had joined the National Unity Platform party, becoming elected its president and presidential flag-bearer in the upcoming February 2021 general election. Kyagulanyi was formally nominated to run for the highest office of presidency on 3 Nov 2020. Shortly after his nomination, Kyagulanyi was arrested by the Ugandan military.

On 6 November 2020, he launched his campaign manifesto in Mbarara (western Uganda) after state operatives cordoned off his NUP party offices preventing him from launching the manifesto from there as planned.

On 18 November 2020, Ssentamu was arrested in Luuka District (Eastern Uganda) and detained at Nalufenya Police Station in Jinja for 3 days. According to the Daily Monitor news paper, "Police accused Mr Kyagulanyi of having more than 200 supporters recommended by the EC to contain further spread of Covid-19."

His arrest was met by wide spread demonstration around the country mostly in parts of Kampala, Masaka, Jinja, Mukono, Mbale and Wakiso. Although the Uganda police alleged that only 54 people were killed, human right activists put the figure to more than 100 murdered and several others injured,

Over 2000 people were incarcerated during the subsequent protests.

Wine's bodyguard Francis Senteza was killed on 27 December 2020, after being run over by a truck belonging to the military police. He was attacked while helping to transport a journalist critically injured by tear gas during an earlier confrontation between the police and a group of Bobi Wine's supporters. Another journalist was also wounded in the incident.

On 16 January the electoral commission announced that Museveni won reelection with 58,6% of the vote. Wine refused to accept the results, claiming that the election was the most fraudulent in Uganda's history.

Wine was placed on house arrest on 15 January, shortly after casting his vote for the presidential election.  The military surrounded his home and did not let anyone in or out for several days, despite Wine claiming he has run out of food. The U.S. ambassador to Uganda, Natalie E. Brown was not allowed to visit or leave food for him as the military blocked the convoy. Wine was released on 26 January after the Ugandan High Court ordered security forces to end the house arrest.
On 1 February, Wine challenged the 2021 elections in court, but later ordered his lawyers to withdraw the case citing bias from the judges, after photos were seen of the chief justice with President Museveni, who was the correspondent party to the lawsuit.

Humanitarian work
Kyagulanyi has supported several practical projects to improve conditions for the poor. In 2012, he started a campaign to promote more regular cleaning in hospitals, sanitation, garbage management, and hand-washing to prevent disease. A YouTube video from September 2012 shows him joining Kampala Lord Mayor Erias Lukwago in cleaning up Kamwookya, the slum neighborhood where Kyagulanyi grew up. The same year, he also donated funds to build pit latrines and construct a drainage channel in Kisenyi II, a Kampala slum that the New Vision described as being "characterized by filth, crowded shanty structures, poor sanitation and lack of basic social facilities." Kyagulanyi explained that he embarked on the project "because these are my people, and no matter where I go, this will always be home."

He has also campaigned for malaria prevention, with donations to Nakasongola Health Centre, and references to the disease in his songs.

In August 2013, Kyagulanyi visited the Bundibugyo Refugee Camp in Bundibugyo District, along with representatives from Save the Children, UNHCR, and the Red Cross, to deliver funds and supplies. The following month, he was named as a parenting ambassador by Twaweza, an NGO that focuses on education and citizen engagement in East Africa; his message in this partnership was to promote responsible parenting among his Ugandan fans. In an interview about the project, he said that "education is what will ultimately change the course of our country and as an artiste and a father, I believe we can all make a difference in our children’s learning."

In 2014, Kyagulanyi was named as an ambassador for Save the Children's EVERY ONE campaign, joining a team of 14 Ugandan artists who recorded a special song and video about maternal and child health. Other leading artists in the video included Jose Chameleone, and Radio and Weasel, who made up the Goodlyfe Crew. Kyagulanyi and his wife Barbara travelled to hospitals throughout Uganda, including Nakaseke Hospital, meeting with midwives and health workers to popularize the campaign. Save the Children also took him to other regions for the campaign, including Nyumanzi Refugee Settlement in northwestern Uganda for South Sudanese people.
Currently, Bobi Wine is the Patron of a girls and teen mothers empowerment Non Government Organisation called Caring Hearts Uganda, founded by his wife Barbie Kyagulanyi. About Caring Hearts Uganda - NonProfit for menstrual health in Uganda. Bobiwine"s Show which was scheduled to happen on 08 october 2022 was canceled by the UNITED ARAB EMIRATES GOVERNMENT on unknown grounds, prior to his arrival he was detained at the Dubai airport for 10hours, he was later released and he spoke to his supporters, the show proceeds were  meant to repatriate stranded ugandans in the United Arab Emirates.https://mobile.twitter.com/HEBobiwine/status/1578697821850476544

Controversies 
Kyagulanyi is often outspoken about political and social issues in Uganda, generating some controversy. Until January 2019, he had a long-standing feud with fellow Ugandan musician Bebe Cool, who has sung in support of President Museveni and the NRM, while Kyagulanyi has supported opposition interests.

In July 2014, it was announced that Kyagulanyi was to perform in the United Kingdom at The Drum Arts Centre in Birmingham and the Troxy in London. This led to calls for a ban because of his lyrics expressing opinions against homosexuality. Both venues subsequently cancelled Kyagulanyi's appearances. In a May 2016 Twitter exchange with ULC Monastery LGBTI, an American Christian group that promotes tolerance toward the LGBT community, Kyagulanyi suggested that he had moved away from his previous homophobic comments, but did not specifically state that his views on homosexuality had changed.

In 2015, Kyagulanyi publicly defended the Buganda kingdom's fundraising efforts as it was harshly criticized by the outspoken Sheikh Muzaata, stirring up a war of words. Kyagulanyi has at times been known as Omubanda wa Kabaka (the king's rogue) for his devotion to the Kabaka (King) of Buganda.

In April 2016, when Uganda's only radiotherapy machine in Mulago broke down, Kyagulanyi took a leading position in widespread public anger at the slow official response, and posted a critique of the government's handling of public health care, challenging the country's leaders to make better use of citizens' taxes.

Throughout the 2015–16 election period, Kyagulanyi refocused his messages to call for tolerance of different views. Kyagulanyi's public calls for calm activism during the 2016 election, with songs such as "Dembe", provoked mixed reactions from different political interests in Uganda. During this period, the Uganda Communications Commission denied that it had banned "Dembe" from Ugandan radio. Three months after the election, the U.S. Ambassador to Uganda Deborah R. Malac invited Kyagulanyi to a formal embassy event, and commented that he was a positive influence for local youth.

When the Ugandan government turned off social media during the 2016 election, Kyagulanyi used a virtual private network (VPN) to post on his defiance to the communications shutdown on his Facebook page while also pointing out that the government continued to use social media during the shutdown they initiated. Kyagulanyi was later chosen as a panelist to speak about freedom of expression on World Press Freedom Day in Kampala in May 2016. In March 2016, he defended the right of his artistic rivals to express views that Kyagulanyi himself does not support.

In August 2020, Kyagulanyi was dragged to court on charges of falsifying information, obtaining registration by false pretense and uttering false documents.

On 3 November 2020, Kyagulanyi was arrested after his nomination to the election body for the upcoming general election was certified. A statement on his official Twitter account said he was violently arrested outside the nomination venue, temporarily blinded and brutalized by police and the military.

Personal life 
While studying at Makerere University, Kyagulanyi met his wife, Barbara Itungo, who at the time was an S6 student at Bweranyangi Girls' Senior Secondary School. Their wedding took place in August 2011 after ten years of living together. They have four children. Kyagulanyi and his family reside in Magere Village, Wakiso District, where he ensures they "go together to dig and get food, whenever we can. I do that because I want them to learn to live an ordinary life, not as a celebrity's children."

On 10 February 2015, Kyagulanyi's father died after a lengthy battle with diabetes. The vigil and burial attracted hundreds of mourners including government officials and other celebrities. One month later, Kyagulanyi released the song "Paradiso", which carries the message of valuing your parents while they are still alive.

Accolades

Awards and nominations

|-
! scope="row" | 2005
| Pearl of Africa Music Awards
| Song of the Year
| "Mama Mbiire" 
| 
| 
|-
! scope="row" rowspan="3" | 2006
| rowspan="2" | Pearl of Africa Music Awards
| Best Afro Beat Single
| "Bada"
| 
| rowspan="2" | 
|-
| Artiste of the Year
| Bobi Wine
| 
|-
| Tanzania Music Awards
| Best East African Album
| Mama Mbiire
| 
| 
|-
! scope="row" rowspan="3" | 2007
| rowspan="2" | Pearl of Africa Music Awards
| Best Afro Beat Single
| "Kiwani"
| 
| rowspan="2" | 
|-
| Best Afro Beat Artiste/Group
| Bobi Wine
| 
|-
| Kisima Music Awards
| Best Song Uganda
| "Bada"
| 
| 
|-
! scope="row" | 2008
| Pearl of Africa Music Awards
| Best Afro Beat Artiste/Group
| Bobi Wine
| 
| 
|-
! scope="row" | 2009
| MTV Africa Music Awards
| Best Video
| "Little Things You Do" 
| 
| 
|-
! scope="row" rowspan="4" | 2013
| rowspan="4" | HiPipo Music Awards
| Artist of the Year
| Bobi Wine
| 
| rowspan="3" | 
|-
| Best Male Artist
| Bobi Wine
| 
|-
| Best Ragga/Dancehall Song
| "By Far"
| 
|-
| Best Afrobeat Song
| "Jennifer"
| 
| 
|-
! scope="row" rowspan="4" | 2018
| rowspan="4" | Zzina Awards
| Afro-Beat Song of the Year
| "Kyarenga"
| 
| rowspan="4" | 
|-
| Male Artiste of the Year
| Bobi Wine
| 
|-
| Artiste of the Year
| Bobi Wine
| 
|-
| Song of the Year
| "Kyarenga"
|

Other honours
 2018 Africanews Personality of the Year
 2019 Foreign Policy Global Thinkers
 2019 Rainbow/PUSH International Humanitarian Award
 2019 Friedrich Naumann Foundation Africa Freedom Prize
 2021 Bobi Wine was announced as the Outstanding Entrepreneurial Artist by Janzi Awards
 2022 Together with Producer Ronie Matovu, Humphrey Nabimanya and Bryan Morel Publications, Bobi Wine was awarded at Forty Under 40 Africa awards in Accra Ghana.

Discography
Discography adapted from Spotify.

Albums
 2015: Bobi Wange
 2015: Hosanah
 2015: Kansubize
 2015: Ontabira
 2015: Sweet
 2018: Kyarenga

Singles and extended plays
 2015: "Ayagala Mulaasi"
 2017: "Freedom"
 2018: "Kyarenga"
 2019: "Tuliyambala Engule"
 2020: "Corona Virus Alert"

Filmography
 2008: Divisionz 
 2010: Yogera
 2015: Situka
 2016: Omubanda wakabaka

References

External links
 
 
 Previous website archive
 

1982 births
Living people
People from Gomba District
People from Central Region, Uganda
Candidates for President of Uganda
Independent politicians in Uganda
Ugandan musicians
Ugandan male actors
Makerere University alumni
Members of the Parliament of Uganda
International University of East Africa alumni
Leaders of political parties in Uganda
National Unity Platform politicians